The 2022 Men's Asian Games Qualifier was the qualification tournament for the men's field hockey event at the 2022 Asian Games. It was held from 6 to 15 May 2022 in Bangkok, Thailand and the top six teams qualified for the 2022 Asian Games.

Teams

Preliminary round

Pool A

Pool B

Fifth to eighth place classification

Bracket

5–8th place semi-finals

Seventh place game

Fifth place game

First to fourth place classification

Bracket

Semi-finals

Third place game

Final

Final standings

See also
 2022 Men's AHF Cup
 Field hockey at the 2022 Asian Games – Women's Qualifier

References

Qualification
2022 Asian Games - Men's Qualifier
May 2022 sports events in Thailand
2022 sports events in Bangkok